was a Japanese manufacturer of audio and video equipment. Headquartered in Tokyo, Japan, it was part of the Bermuda conglomerate (from 2011).

The company was founded in Tokyo in 1947 by Kosaku Kikuchi, who had worked for a radio parts distributor in Tokyo before and during World War II.  Due to the poor quality of radio parts Kikuchi had to deal with, he decided to start his private radio part manufacturer facility in December 1944 in Yoyogi, Tokyo. He picked transformers as his initial product line. Kikuchi's thought was "Even with higher prices, let's make the higher quality of products."

In 1954 manufacturing Pre-Amp, Main-Amp kits, as well as finished amplifiers which used tubes, was started; in 1958 Sansui introduced the first stereo tube Pre- and Main amplifiers. By the 1960s Sansui had developed a reputation for making serious audio components. They were sold in foreign markets through that and the next decade. Sansui's amplifiers and tuners from the 1960s and 1970s remain in demand by audio enthusiasts.
Since 1965 the iconic matte-black-faced AU-series amplifiers were released. In 1967 Sansui produced its first turntable.

In 1971, Sansui introduced the Quadphonic Synthesizer QS-1, which could make simulated four-channel stereo from two-channel sources. Sansui developed the QS Regular Matrix system, which made it possible to transmit four-channel Quadraphonic sound from a standard LP. The channel separation was only 3 dB, but because of the human way of hearing it sounded relatively good. In 1973, Sansui introduced the more advanced QS Vario Matrix decoder with 20 dB separation. Unfortunately, the SQ system developed by  Columbia/CBS was the most popular matrix system. But later QS decoders could also play SQ records. Some Sansui receivers could also play the most advanced four-channel system – CD-4 (or Quadradisc) by Japanese JVC and American RCA. Most big record companies used either SQ or CD-4, but Decca used the Sansui QS system. For completeness, it should be mentioned that the 2-channel-range was extended by tape machines and cassette decks, too. The company also produced in the mid-70s, the Sansui AU-11000 which was known for its high-output power and low Total harmonic distortion.

In 1974 Kosaku Kikuchi resigned, and vice-president Kenzo Fujiwara became president.

In the late 1970s, the first-generation '07' models included the dual-mono power supply AU-517 and AU-717, and the second generation featured the updated AU-719, 819, and 919 were released. The separate pre-amp/power-amp CA-F1/BA-F1 topped the model range along with the AU-X1 integrated amplifier (1979).

In the UK around 1982, the Sansui AU-D101 amplifier and its more powerful sibling the AU-D33, were acclaimed by audiophiles and were so well matched to a pair of KEF Coda III speakers that they could be bought as a set from some outlets. These amplifiers used a complex feed-forward servo system which resulted in very low second order harmonic distortion.  Despite this success, Sansui failed to follow up with further mass-market audiophile components.

As the mid-1980s arrived, sales were lost to competitors (Sony, Pioneer, Matsushita's Technics). Sansui began to lose visibility in the United States around 1988, and then focused on manufacturing high-end components in Japan. The company began to manufacture high-end television sets and other video equipment, but ceased exportation. In the late 1990s, the company's brand was used on video equipment manufactured by other companies. The current manufacturer of the rebranded sets is Orion Electric, based in Osaka and Fukui, Japan. Its U.S. subsidiary markets products under the Sansui brand, among others. Sansui is thus a mere umbrella brand at present. This radical change in Sansui's corporate identity has resulted in a notable change in its product quality as consumers now tend to consider Sansui a mass-market brand rather than a maker of high-end electronics.

Sansui had developed the patented α(alpha)-x balanced circuit,  that used in its high power amplifier along with the so-called double diamond differential, another patent for balanced driver stage. Lately Sansui had developed a turntable, P-L95R, with a handling similar to CD-players; it allowed to play both sides of the record without turning it. 
 
Sansui ended its Japanese production of high-end amplifiers some time between 2002 and 2005. In 2001 the headquarters in Shi-Yokohama was closed.

The Japanese website as HiFi-manufacturer was last updated January 2014; Sansui went out of business in 2014. Sansui's sales had shriveled to just 40.4 million yen by 2010. The 2003 founded Sansui Electric China Co Ltd stayed longer than 2014. In Japan, consumer product maker Doshisha has the right to manufacture and sell under the Sansui brand. Outside of Japan, the brand belongs to Nimble Holdings of Hong Kong.

Many Sansui devices, particularly vintage items, have a large following in the audio community to date, with online forums dedicated to the Sansui brand.

See also
 List of phonograph manufacturers

References

External links 

 Sansui at audio-database.com (with pictures)
 Audiokarma, a Popular Sansui Enthusiasts Forum
 Global website
 US website
 Sansui India website
 Sansui India Address

Japanese companies established in 1947
Japanese companies disestablished in 2014
Audio equipment manufacturers of Japan
Japanese brands
Manufacturing companies established in 1947
Manufacturing companies disestablished in 2014
Phonograph manufacturers
Technology companies established in 1947
Technology companies disestablished in 2014
Video equipment manufacturers
Mobile phone manufacturers
Radio manufacturers